Samuel Hadden Harper (1783 – July 19, 1837) was a United States district judge of the United States District Court for the Eastern District of Louisiana and the United States District Court for the Western District of Louisiana.

Education and career

Born in Augusta County, Virginia, Harper was in private practice in New Orleans, Louisiana from 1808 to 1829. He also served in the United States Army during the War of 1812 and became a lieutenant colonel. He was a member of the Louisiana House of Representatives in 1814, and was a registrar in the land office of the Eastern District of Louisiana from 1821 to 1824. In 1825, he was a clerk for the United States District Court for the Eastern District of Louisiana, and a city councilman of New Orleans.

Federal judicial service

Harper was nominated by President Andrew Jackson on March 6, 1829, to a joint seat on the United States District Court for the Eastern District of Louisiana and the United States District Court for the Western District of Louisiana vacated by Judge Thomas B. Robertson. He was confirmed by the United States Senate on March 7, 1829, and received his commission the same day. His service terminated on July 19, 1837, due to his death in Madisonville, Louisiana.

References

Sources
 

1783 births
1837 deaths
Judges of the United States District Court for the Western District of Louisiana
Judges of the United States District Court for the Eastern District of Louisiana
United States federal judges appointed by Andrew Jackson
19th-century American judges
United States Army officers